Kenneth James Muir MacKenzie (1 May 1882 – 3 June 1931) was a British soldier, lawyer, and judge.  After serving initially as Solicitor General of the East Africa Protectorate from 30 November 1919, he went on to serve as Attorney General of Fiji from 1922 to 1927. He acted in an interim capacity as Chief Justice of Fiji and Chief Judicial Commissioner for the Western Pacific from 1922 to 1923. He also served as a member of the Legislative Council of Fiji in 1927.

Muir MacKenzie served in the 5th Battalion, Royal Munster Fusiliers, attaining the rank of Captain.

Family 
Born in India, Muir MacKenzie was the son of Sir John William Pitt Muir MacKenzie, an administrator in British India, and Fanny Louisa Johnstone. On 24 July 1915 he married Phyllis Taylor, daughter of Henry Howard Taylor. They had twin children: Lieutenant Commander Hamish Muir MacKenzie (20 October 1917 – 18 June 1947) and Susan Muir MacKenzie (20 October 1917 – 1978).

References

|-

Attorneys General of the Colony of Fiji
Attorneys-general of Fiji
Chief justices of Fiji
Chief judicial commissioners for the Western Pacific
1882 births
1931 deaths
British colonial officials
Royal Munster Fusiliers officers
East Africa Protectorate people
Solicitors general
Ethnic minority members of the Legislative Council of Fiji
Colony of Fiji judges
Honourable Artillery Company officers
British Army personnel of World War I
British people in colonial India